WHAY (98.3 FM) is a radio station licensed to and located in Whitley City, Kentucky playing a full-service format. The station is owned by H L Com, Inc. (Linda Lavender, Administrator).

History 
The Federal Communications Commission has granted the construction permit for WHAY on November 29, 1989. The station signed on the air one year and two days later, on December 1, 1990. On June 12, 1992, the station went off the air temporarily, but returned to the air three months later.

Programming 
The station consist of many shows. Some of which include Swap-n-Shop, Eclectic Circus, Americana Masters, Country Turnpike, Grateful Dead Hour and many others! The station plays an eclectic mix from Americana to classic country, bluegrass, blues and rock music.

The Kentucky News Network provides hourly news updates.

References

External links
WHAY station website 

HAY
Radio stations established in 1990
McCreary County, Kentucky